The al-Hawl refugee camp (also al-Hol refugee camp) is a refugee camp on the southern outskirts of the town of al-Hawl in northern Syria, close to the Syria-Iraq border, which holds individuals displaced from the Islamic State of Iraq and the Levant. The camp is nominally controlled by the US-backed Syrian Democratic Forces (SDF) but according the U.S. Government, much of the camp is run by Islamic State of Iraq and the Levant who use the camp for indoctrination and recruitment purposes.

As of February 2021, the camp's population was more than 60,000 having grown from 10,000 at the beginning of 2019 after the SDF took the last of the Islamic State's territory in Syria in the Battle of Baghuz Fawqani. The refugees are women and children from many countries, primarily Syria and Iraq.

Background
The camp was originally established for Iraqi refugees in early 1991, during the Gulf war, and was later reopened after the 2003 invasion of Iraq as one of three camps at the Iraqi–Syrian border.

Demographics

While at the beginning of 2019 the camp held about 10,000 people its size increased dramatically with the collapse of ISIS. By February 2021, the camp's population was estimated at more than 60,000. An estimate in September 2019 indicated that the camp held about 20,000 women and 50,000 children from the former Islamic State of Iraq and the Levant (ISIL) guarded by 400 SDF militia fighters.

Administration and conditions in the camp
In the context of the Syrian Civil War and the takeover of al-Hawl by the SDF, the camp, alongside the Ayn Issa refugee camp has become a center for refugees from the fighting between the SDF and ISIL during the SDF campaign in Deir ez-Zor and the camp held approximately 10,000 refugees in early December 2018. In April 2018, a typhoid outbreak killed 24 people in the camp.

During the Battle of Baghuz Fawqani in December 2018, the camp saw a massive influx of refugees in a series of massive civilian evacuations, with people fleeing the fierce fighting between the SDF and ISIL. Conditions along the road to the camp, including in screening centers for ISIL operatives, have been described as "extremely harsh" with limited food, water, shelter and no health services. As of 4 February 2019, at least 35 children and newborns had also reportedly died either en route or shortly after arriving in the camp, mostly due to hypothermia. Aid organizations feared dysentery and other diseases could break out from the overflowing camp. The UN stated that 84 people, mostly children, died on the way to al-Hawl since December 2018. Families of Daesh fighters are kept at a separate guarded section of the camp after repeated violent incidents between them and other members of the camp.

In February 2019, Zehra Duman, an Australian who married an Australian jihadi fighter shortly after her arrival, told her mother she and her two young children were living in the camp.  She told her mother that there was a terrible shortage of food, and she feared her six-month-old daughter would starve to death. In early 2019, pregnant ISIL member Shamima Begum was found in the al-Hawl camp.  Her newborn son died within weeks of birth. In March 2019, the former American citizen and former ISIL member Hoda Muthana and her 18-month-old son were also reported to be living in the camp.

At least 100 people have died during the trip, or shortly after arriving at the camp since December 2018.

In April 2019, women and girls at the camp told a female journalist, "Convert, convert!" urging her to recite the shahada. They told her, "If you became Muslim and cover (your body and face) like us and became a member of our religion, you would not be killed". Many of them prayed for the caliphate of ISIL to return. The women justified the genocide of Yazidis by ISIL and ISIL's taking of Yazidi sex slaves. An Iraqi woman said, "If they don't convert to Islam and they don't become Muslim like us and worship Allah, then they deserve it."

In a report published in April 2019, BBC journalist Quentin Sommerville described the camp as "an overflowing vessel of anger and unanswered questions," where some women "cling to their hate-fuelled ideology, others beg for a way out - a way home." Quentin quoted a Moroccan-Belgian woman, a former nurse who grabbed her niqab saying: "This is my choice. In Belgium I couldn't wear my niqab - this is my choice. Every religion did something wrong, show us the good." The woman saw there was no need to apologise for the IS attack in Brussels in 2016 and blamed the West and its air-strikes on Baghouz for their dire conditions.

A report in The Washington Post from September 2019 describes the increased radicalization within the camp where conditions are dismal, security lax, and people who do not follow ISIS ideology live in fear.

On 28 November 2019, the Syrian Arab Red Crescent announced that over 36,000 of the camp's inhabitants had received aid from the organization at clinics established in the camp and via a mobile medical team there. In October 2020, in an attempt to address the situation of the overpopulation of the camp, it was announced that the authorities of the Autonomous Administration of North and East Syria (AANES) decided to release all the Syrian nationals from the camp, which account for about half of the population of the camp. There would still remain over 25,000 Iraqi and 10,000 people from other nationalities in the refugee camp.

In October 2020, SDF announced plans to free thousands of Syrians held at the Al-Hawl refugee camp.
The process was slow, at the beginning of 2022 there where still around 56,500 people living in the camp.

During January and February 2021, 21 people were killed by cells of the Islamic State of Iraq and the Levant which was more than triple the number of people killed in recent months in what the Syrian Observatory for Human Rights described as the "Al-Hawl mini-state."

Repatriation efforts
Repatriation is difficult as many camp residents have become radicalized and pose a potential threat to their home country. Sommerville indicated that "western governments prevaricate" or may not have plans to take people back.

It was reported in September 2020 that Kurdish authorities had transferred 50 Australian nationals from al-Hawl camp to the smaller Roj camp where, it's claimed, there was more of a focus on re-education and rehabilitation. The Australian government has lacked the political will to repatriate its nationals from Syria in fear of bringing radicalized individuals into the country.

See also
Al-Hawl
Deir ez-Zor campaign (2017–2019)
Battle of Baghuz Fawqani
Brides of ISIL

References 

Al-Hasakah District
Refugee camps in Syria